Sarcodraba is a genus of flowering plants belonging to the family Brassicaceae.

It is native to Argentina and Chile in southern South America.

Known species
As accepted by Plants of the World Online;
Sarcodraba andina 
Sarcodraba dusenii 
Sarcodraba karr-aikensis 
Sarcodraba subterranea 

The genus name of Sarcodraba is derived from the Greek sarx, sarkos meaning fleshy and the plant genus of Draba 
It was first described and published in Bot. Jahrb. Syst. Vol.42 on page 468 in 1909.

The genus is recognized by the United States Department of Agriculture and the Agricultural Research Service, but they do not list any known species.

References

Brassicaceae
Brassicaceae genera
Plants described in 1909
Flora of Northwest Argentina
Flora of South Argentina
Flora of southern Chile